The Iclingas (also Iclings or House of Icel) were a  dynasty of Kings of Mercia during the 7th and 8th centuries, named for Icel or Icil, great-grandson of Offa of Angel, a legendary or semi-legendary figure of the Migration Period who is described as a descendant of the god Woden by the Anglo-Saxon royal genealogies. 

The Iclingas reached the height of their power under Offa of Mercia (r. 757–796), who achieved hegemony over the other Anglo-Saxon states, and proclaimed himself "King of the English", but the dynasty lost control of Mercia soon after his death.
Penda, who became king of Mercia in about 626 and is the first king named in the regnal lists of the Anglian collection, and at the same time the last pagan king of Mercia, gave rise to a dynasty that supplied at least eleven kings to the throne of Mercia.  Four additional monarchs were given an Icling pedigree in later genealogical sources but are now believed to have descended from the family by way of Penda's sister.

Icel himself is of debatable historicity; according to Nicholas Brooks, if historical he would have lived sometime between 450 and 525 and was probably considered the founder of the dynasty because he was the first of his line in Britain. Despite the Icelingas' claims of ties with the rulers and mythic heroes of continental Angeln and with the war-god Woden, Brooks suggests that the Icelingas were, before Penda's rise in prominence, no more and no less royal than any of the other ruling houses of the small Midlands peoples as recorded in the Tribal Hidage and assessed as having between 300 and 600 hides of land.
Icel's ancestry in genealogical tradition is as follows: Icel son of Eomer son of Angeltheow son of Offa son of Wermund son of Wihtlæg son, grandson or great-grandson of Woden.
In this tradition, Icel is the leader of the Angles who migrated to Britain. Icel is then separated from the establishment of Mercia by three generations: Icel's son was Cnebba, whose son was Cynewald, whose son was Creoda, first king of Mercia.

Matthew Paris s.a. 527 reports, "pagans came from Germania and occupied East Anglia... some of whom invaded Mercia and fought many battles with the British[.]" This date, however, should perhaps be amended to 515.
The Vita Sancti Guthlaci ("Life of Saint Guthlac") reports Guthlac of Crowland to have been son of Penwalh, a Mercian who could trace his pedigree back to Icel.

Several place names in England have been suggested as derived from the name of Icel or the Iclingas, including Icklingham, Ickleford, Ickleton and Ixworth. Norman Scarfe noted that the Icknield Way had early spellings Icenhylte weg and Icenhilde weg and suggested a connection between Icklingham and the Iceni, although Warner (1988) has cast doubt on the identification. The name Iclinga  survives as "Hickling" and several similar spellings.

List of kings
The following are Iclinga kings of Mercia whose historicity is certain.
Creoda of Mercia is of uncertain historicity (if historical, he would date to the end of the 6th century). Cearl of Mercia who ruled during the early 7th century was probably not an Icling.

Family tree

References

See also
List of monarchs of Mercia
Kings of the Angles
Anglo-Saxon royal genealogies
Wuffingas

Mercian monarchs
Anglish people